Ǵ, ǵ (G with acute accent) represents the Pashto letter geh (ږ), the Macedonian letter gje Ѓ and, in Karakalpak, /ʁ/ (Cyrillic Ғ) and parts of Cantonese Yale Nǵ and Nǵh. The letter is also used to transcribe the Old Church Slavic letter djerv Ꙉ.

The 2019 reformed alphabet for Uzbek also contains this letter. It is currently represented by Gʻ.

In Kazakh, it was suggested to use it to replace the Cyrillic Ғ, but in 2019 the replacement suggestion was replaced by Ğ.

Computing code

References

Latin letters with diacritics
Polish letters with diacritics